Chasseradès is a former commune in the Lozère department in southern France. On 1 January 2017, it was merged into the new commune Mont Lozère et Goulet. Its population was 138 in 2019.

The Scottish author Robert Louis Stevenson stayed at an inn in the village of Chasseradès on the night of 27 September 1878, as recounted in his book Travels with a Donkey in the Cévennes. The Robert Louis Stevenson Trail (GR 70), a popular long-distance path following Stevenson's approximate route, runs through the village.

Geography
The commune is traversed by the river Chassezac.

See also
Communes of the Lozère department

References

External links

Chasserades in Lozere (French; photographs)
Stevenson Trail GR70 Hiking trail

Former communes of Lozère